Khwaja Atiqullah (1876–1945) was a Bengali British Indian politician and member of the Dhaka Nawab Family.

Early life

He was born on 26 July 1876. He was taught by private British teachers. He learned English, Persian and Urdu. He was noted for his philanthropy. He donated one thousand rupees to the Aligarh University Fund in 1911.  The Nawab of Dhaka, his father Nawab Sir Khwaja Ahsanullah celebrated the Atiqullah's marriage on 7 December 1901, by donating four 4 hundred thousand rupees for the electrification of Dhaka.

Career
On 31 December 1906 he petitioned the British Raj to reconsider the Partition of Bengal. Initially he was an advocate of United India and Muslim-Hindu unity. He was a proponent of Syed Ahmed Khan. He later changed his views after the annulment of the partition on 12 December 1911. Nawab Bahadur Sir Khwaja Salimullah held a meeting of the leading Bengali Muslims where Atiqullah supported a new partition. He proposed Muslim majority region of Assam province to be included in the proposed East Bengal.

He had differences over the ancestral property with his brothers after Nawab Bahadur Sir Khwaja Salimullah appointed his son Khwaja Habibullah the Mutawalli (Guardian) of the property. Atiqullah filed a case claiming himself as the true Mutawalli but lost it. Initially he was a strong supporter of the Indian National Congress but later supported All India Muslim League. He held Musical and cultural events in his house Dilkusha Garden.

Death
He died in January 1945. His daughter Farhat Banu was married to Khwaja Shahabuddin, his nephew.

References

Members of the Dhaka Nawab family
1876 births
1945 deaths
20th-century Bengalis
19th-century Bengalis
Politicians from British India